Ellen Story is an American state legislator who served in the Massachusetts House of Representatives.

Early life
Story lived in Texas before moving to Amherst in 1972. She earned a bachelor's degree at the University of Texas. Story worked for the Family Planning Council of Western Massachusetts for 17 years. She also served on the Amherst School Committee.

Political career
Story's policy during her time in the Massachusetts House of Representatives focused on issues related to women, mental health, GMOs and raising the income tax.

References

Members of the Massachusetts House of Representatives
21st-century American politicians
Women state legislators in Massachusetts
1941 births
Living people
21st-century American women politicians